The Women's 4 × 5 kilometre relay at the FIS Nordic World Ski Championships 2009 was held on 26 February 2009 at 13:00 CET. The defending world champions were the Finnish team of Virpi Kuitunen, Aino-Kaisa Saarinen, Riitta-Liisa Roponen and Pirjo Manninen.

Results

References

External links
Final results - International Ski Federation (FIS)

FIS Nordic World Ski Championships 2009
2009 in Norwegian women's sport